Swan River Press is an independent Irish publishing company dedicated to gothic, supernatural, and fantastic literature. It was founded in Rathmines, Dublin in October 2003 by Brian J. Showers. Swan River publishes contemporary fiction from around the world with an emphasis on Ireland's past and present contributions to the genre. They also issue the non-fiction journal The Green Book: Writings on Irish Gothic, Supernatural and Fantastic Literature, and sporadically organise the Dublin Ghost Story Festival.

History
Swan River Press was founded in 2003, originally to print hand-sewn chapbooks and booklets for private distribution. In 2010 Swan River published their first hardback title The Old Knowledge & Other Strange Stories by Rosalie Parker. The company name comes from the subterranean waterway which flows through the neighbourhood of Rathmines in Dublin and the logo was created by Duane Spurlock from the image of the keystone on the entrance of the Rathmines town hall.

Publishing
Swan River specializes in publishing high quality editions with dust jackets, printed boards, sewn binding, and head and tail bands on its hardbound books, with all booklets being hand-sewn. The press is financed by the sales of the books and by patrons who can sign up at various levels of support. Swan River Press has worked with artists such as Lorena Carrington, Brian Catling, Brian Coldrick, John Coulthart, Dave McKean, Mike Mignola, Alisdair Wood, and Jason Zerrillo to create distinctive covers and designs. The publisher features contemporary authors such as Mark Valentine, and Helen Grant in the Uncertainties anthology series as well as classic works by writers including Bram Stoker, J. S. Le Fanu, B. M. Croker, Thomas Leland, and George William Russell (A.E.). The two sides are united by the press in William Hope Hodgson’s The House on the Borderland, which features an introduction by Alan Moore and an afterword by Iain Sinclair.

Uncertainties
Uncertainties is a series of anthologies considered to be the flagship publications of the company. Stories from this series have been given honourable mention in or selected for Ellen Datlow’s Best Horror of the Year and Stephen Jones’s Best New Horror reprint anthologies. The volumes are  "the very latest in weird storytelling" according to Michael Dirda in the Washington Post; with the series lauded by Joyce Carol Oates in the Times Literary Supplement as "Among the most memorable books I’ve read this year".

The Green Book
Since 2013, the press has published a twice-yearly journal The Green Book: Writings on Irish Gothic, Supernatural and Fantastic Literature. Ellen Datlow called The Green Book, "A welcome addition to the realm of accessible nonfiction about supernatural horror."  The publication includes articles and commentaries on Irish genre writers and their work, as well as reprints of classic writing, interviews, and occasional fiction, including previously uncollected work by both Bram Stoker and Dorothy Macardle. Past themed issues have given focus to J. S. Le Fanu on the bicentenary of his birth, the 1916 Easter Rising, writing by Irish women, and Lord Dunsany.

Awards
Dreams of Shadow and Smoke: Stories for J. S. Le Fanu, edited by Jim Rockhill and Brian J. Showers, won the Ghost Story Award for best anthology in 2014.

Selected Bibliography

Novels
 Munky (2020) by B. Catling
 Green Tea (2019) by Joseph Sheridan Le Fanu
 The House on the Borderland (2018) by  William Hope Hodgson
 The Pale Brown Thing (2016) by Fritz Leiber
 Longsword (2012) by Thomas Leland
 Lucifer and the Child (2020) by Ethel Mannin
 The Dark Return of Time (2014) by R. B. Russell
 The Unfortunate Fursey (2015) by Mervyn Wall
 The Return of Fursey (2015) by Mervyn Wall
 Leaves for the Burning (2020) by Mervyn Wall

Collections

Anthologies
 Bending to Earth: Strange Stories by Irish Women (2019) edited by Maria Giakaniki and Brian J. Showers
 Dreams of Shadow & Smoke: Stories for J. S. Le Fanu (2014) edited by Jim Rockhill and Brian J. Showers
 The Far Tower: Stories for W. B. Yeats (2019) edited by Mark Valentine
 Ghosts of the Chit-Chat (2020) edited by Robert Lloyd Parry
 The Scarlet Soul: Stories for Dorian Gray (2017) edited by Mark Valentine
 Uncertainties I (2016) edited by Brian J. Showers
 Uncertainties II (2016) edited by Brian J. Showers
 Uncertainties III (2018) edited by Lynda E. Rucker
 Uncertainties IV (2020) edited by Timothy J. Jarvis
 Uncertainties V (2021) edited by Brian J. Showers

Dublin Ghost Story Festival

Swan River Press organised two Dublin Ghost Story Festivals. The first on 19 - 21 August 2016, co-organised with Irish author John Connolly; the second on 29 June - 1 July 2018. The venue for both festivals was the Grand Lodge of Ireland on Molesworth Street.

The guest of honour in 2016 was Adam L. G. Nevill, while other guests included Sarah Pinborough, Angela Slatter, and David Mitchell. In addition to readings and panel discussions, the festival featured a performance of M.R. James's "Casting the Runes" by Robert Lloyd Parry of Nunkie Theatre Company.

In 2018 the guest of honour was Pulitzer-prize winning author Joyce Carol Oates. Other guests included Lisa Tuttle, Nicholas Royle, and Andrew Michael Hurley. The festival opened with a talk, "The Lure of the Ghost Story", by Reggie Oliver, as well as a reading of his story "Quieta non Movere".

The Dublin Ghost Story Festival logo was designed by Alisdair Wood.

Authors 
Authors published by Swan River Press have included:

See also
 Supernatural Fiction
 Irish Literature
 Small Press
 Book Collecting

References

External links 
 Swan River Press Official Website
 The Green Book Official Website
 Dublin Ghost Story Festival Official Website
 Swan River Press Blog
 Brian J Showers interviewed by Jon Mueller
 Brian J Showers interviewed by GreyDogTales
 Swan River Press at Internet Speculative Fiction Database

Irish speculative fiction publishers
Publishing companies established in 2003
Small press publishing companies
Horror book publishing companies
Publishing companies of Ireland
Book publishing companies of Ireland